Hastings railway station is the southern terminus of the Hastings line in the south of England and is one of four stations that serve the town of Hastings, East Sussex.

The station is managed by Southeastern, which is one of two train operating companies at the station, alongside Southern.

History

The station was first proposed by the South Eastern Railway (SER) on 9 October 1835, as the terminus for a railway from Tunbridge Wells via Rye. These plans began to take fruition during 1843, as the SER planned the most practical route to the town through what would be difficult terrain. In the meantime, the Parliamentary Select Committee had supported a scheme by the Brighton, Lewes & Hastings Railway (BLHR), which would connect the town to the London and Brighton Railway (LBR). The BLHR were awarded the act of parliament to build the railway to Hastings, with an additional option to extend the line through Rye to Ashford. The SER were not happy about a rival company building routes in their area, and in late 1845 researched the feasibility of a route via Tunbridge Wells.  The Government insisted the SER constructed the line from Ashford to Hastings (now the Marshlink line) first before any direct route could be built. Meanwhile, the LBR and BLHR had amalgamated with other companies to form the London, Brighton and South Coast Railway, who became bitter rivals with the SER.

The station opened on 13 February 1851 when the line from Ashford was completed through to Bopeep Junction. The station was originally V-shaped allowing the two railway companies to have separate platforms and booking areas: one side for SER trains to pass through and the other as a terminal for LBSCR services. The two companies continued to argue with each other and object to trains stopping or passing through the station. The SER also wanted separate goods sheds from the LBSCR. The connection to Tunbridge Wells opened on 1 February 1852.

The whole station was reconstructed in a neo-Georgian style in 1931 by the architect James Robb Scott and only the goods shed remained unchanged. All trains now ran through the two new island platforms, which provided better flexibility.

The station building was re-built in 2004, with the neo-Georgian booking hall demolished and replaced with a modernist building. The southernmost loop platform has been curtailed into an Ashford facing bay. The station contains a small police post staffed by British Transport Police, although this is a satellite of the Ashford International police station.

Services 
Services at Hastings are operated by Southern and Southeastern.

The typical off-peak service in trains per hour is:

Southern
 1 tph to  via 
 1 tph to 
 1 tph to 

During the peak hours and on Saturdays, the station is also served by an additional hourly semi-fast service between Brighton and Ore.

Southern services at Hastings are operated using  EMUs and  DMUs.

Southeastern
 2 tph to London Charing Cross via  (1 semi-fast, 1 stopping)

Southeastern services at Hastings are operated using  EMUs.

Facilities 
The station provides a ticket office, waiting room and toilets. Retail facilities include a coffee shop and newsagent. Outside the station there are a bus station, taxi rank and car park.

Other stations in Hastings 

 West St Leonards, Bulverhythe
 Bulverhythe station, Bulverhythe (closed) a temporary terminus until the line extended to St Leonards West Marina
 St Leonards West Marina railway station,a closed station on the LBSCR. (closed)
 St Leonards Warrior Square, St Leonards.
 Ore Railway Station, small station in Ore.

References
Citations

Sources

External links 

Transport in Hastings
Railway stations in East Sussex
DfT Category C1 stations
Former South Eastern Railway (UK) stations
Railway stations in Great Britain opened in 1851
Railway stations served by Govia Thameslink Railway
Railway stations served by Southeastern
1851 establishments in England
Train driver depots in England